The Agriculture and Horticulture Development Board (AHDB) is a levy board funded by farmers and growers and some other parts of the supply chain. It aims to enhance farm business efficiency and competitiveness in the areas of: pig, beef and lamb production in England; milk, potatoes and horticulture in Great Britain; and cereals and oilseeds in the United Kingdom. It undertakes research and development and farm-level knowledge transfer activity, provides essential market information to improve supply chain transparency and undertakes marketing promotion activities to help stimulate demand and to develop export markets. These are activities which most individual farm businesses could not afford to do themselves.

History
It was formed on 1 April 2008, from five previous organisations which were similarly levy-funded, which were the British Potato Council; the Home-Grown Cereals Authority; the Horticultural Development Council; the Meat and Livestock Commission; and the Milk Development Council.

It was created using powers granted under the Natural Environment and Rural Communities Act 2006.

Function
Its statutory purpose is to improve UK farm business efficiency and competitiveness. This is defined as: 
(a) increasing efficiency or productivity in the industry;

(b) improving marketing in the industry;

(c) improving or developing services that the industry provides or could provide to the community; and

(d) improving the ways in which the industry contributes to sustainable development.

Structure
It is structured with six operating divisions representing the commodity sectors covered by its statutory remit:
 pigs (pork) in England
 dairy (milk) in Great Britain
 beef and lamb in England
 horticulture in Great Britain
 cereals and oilseeds in the United Kingdom
 Potato Council - potatoes in Great Britain

Funding
Farmers, growers and others in the food supply chain pay a statutory levy and in return receive services that they might not otherwise be able to afford to invest in, like research and development, market intelligence information and trade development and marketing. The levy rate is recommended by advisory boards composed of levy payers and agreed by the AHDB Board and by UK Ministers.

References

External links
 

Organizations established in 2008
Organisations based in Warwickshire
Agricultural organisations based in the United Kingdom
Agricultural marketing organizations
Department for Environment, Food and Rural Affairs
Non-departmental public bodies of the United Kingdom government
2008 establishments in the United Kingdom